The Global Child Forum is a Swedish non-profit foundation, based in Stockholm, Sweden. The organization was founded by King Carl XVI Gustaf and Queen Silvia of Sweden in 2009 in order to advance children’s rights in accordance with the UN Convention on the Rights of the Child.

The focus of Global Child Forum is grounded in both the Convention on the Rights of a Child and UNICEF's Children’s Rights and Business Principles and is aimed towards giving business an understanding of how and where their business might impact children.

History 
Global Child Forum was founded in 2009 as World Child and Youth Forum (WCYF). The name was then shorted to Global Child Forum in 2012. Initially, WCYF was intended to be an independent group of decision-makers with the goal of discussing children’s rights and business while using the Royal Palace as a venue. Since then, the organization has expanded to include Regional Forums and conduct its own independent research.

Forums 
Global Child Forum is best known for its global and regional forums. Each Forum consists of speaker sessions, panel discussions, and breakout Action Labs. Global forums are held at the Royal Palace in Stockholm and bring together top business leaders, political leaders, academics, and civil society representatives to discuss pressing issues related to children’s rights and business. Regional forums are designed to tackle children’s rights issues faced by that particular region with regional leaders in business, politics, academics, and civil society.

Global forums 
To date, five global forums have been held at the Royal Palace. Approximately 300 global leaders in business, politics, civil society and academia have attended each of the forums. Each event has its own theme on issues concerning children’s rights and business. The latest global forum was 11 April 2018 and discussed investing in every child. During the 2018 Forum, the Global Child Forum Pledge was launched to encourage action amongst participants post-Forum.  Additionally, for the first time, the Forum included child participants, Indonesian child laborers from the It's Time to Talk! report on child labour.

Regional forums 
The regional forum is held every year in a new location. The forums brings together approximately 300 regional leaders in business, politics, civil society and academia to discuss issues concerning children’s rights and business within the context of their region. To date, the Global Child Forum has held four regional forums: one in the Middle East and North Africa, Southern Africa, Southeast Asia and South America.

Notable speakers

Regional Forum - Southern Africa 2015 
 Nkosazana Dlamini Zuma – head, African Union Commission
 Bjorn Grindberg – head of social investment, Millicom
 Driekie Havenga- group ethics officer, Nedbank
 Benyam Dawit Mezmur – chairperson, UN Committee on the Rights of the Child
 Lindiwe Mokate – commissioner, South African Human Rights Commission
 Geoff Rothschild – patron, Nelson Mandela Children's Hospital

Global Forum - Stockholm, Sweden 2015 
 Anne-Birgitte Albrectsen – chief executive officer, Plan International
 Zeid Ra'ad Al Hussein – UN commissioner for human rights
 H.E Shaikha Al Maskari – chief executive, Al Maskari Holding
 Michael Baldinger – chief executive officer, RobecoSAM
 Irina Bokova – director-general, UNESCO
 Winne Byanyima- executive director, Oxfam International
 Petter Johnsen – chief investment officer, equity strategies, Norges Bank Investment Management
 Stefan Löfven – prime minister, Sweden
 Charlotte Petri Gornitzka – director-general, Sida
 Seokpil Kim – executive vice president, public affairs, Samsung
 Karl Henrik Sundström – chief executive officer, Stora Enso

Regional Forum - Southeast Asia 2016 
 YW Junardy – member, UN Global Compact
 Dato Sri Rohani Abdul Karim – minister, Ministry of Women, Family and Community Development, Malaysia
 Simon Lord – group sustainability officer, Sime Darby
 H.E Le Luong Minh – secretary general, ASEAN
 Thomas Thomas – CEO, ASEAN CSR Network

Regional Forum - South America 2017 
 H.E Michel Temer – President of the Republic of Brazil
 Clara Lopez Obregon – Minister of Labor, Colombia
 Luis Alberto Moreno – Inter-American Development Bank
 Mike Parra – chief executive officer of the Americas, DHL Express
 Marta Santos Pais – representative of the UN Secretary General on Violence against Children
 Paulo Skaf – president, Federation of Industries of the State of São Paulo (FIESP)

Global Forum - Stockholm, Sweden 2018 

 Crown Princess Victoria of Sweden
 Natalie Au - global director, Girl Effect
 Lydia Capolicchio - moderator
 Anna Maria Corazza Bildt - member, European Parliament
 Mikael Damberg - Minister for Enterprise and Innovation, Sweden 
 Johan Dennelind - chief executive officer, Telia Company
 Professor Brian Ganson - head, Africa Centre for Dispute Settlement, University of Stellenbosch
 Georg Kell - chairman, Arabesque
 Lise Kingo - chief executive director and executive director, United Nations Global Compact
 HRH Princess Laurentien of the Netherlands - founder, Missing Chapter Foundation
 Fatoumata Ndiaye - deputy executive director, management, UNICEF
 Hanna Roberts - chief executive officer, GES International
 Nina Schefte - corporate social responsibility manager, Norsk Hydro
 Paul Schoenmakers - head of impact, Tony's Chocolonely
 Julie Wallace - global head, community engagement, Standard Chartered Bank
 Carine Smith Ihenacho - chief corporate governance officer, Norges Bank Investment Management
 Leon Wijnands - global head of sustainability, ING Bank

Research 
The Global Child Forum conducts independent research and case studies. The benchmark reports, written in collaboration with the Boston Consulting Group, are developed to be presented at regional forums and evaluate the top 300 publicly traded companies from regions where regional forums are to be held, and assesses their commitment to children’s rights issues. Previously, the 2016 benchmark highlighted how the Nordic region lagged below the global average on children’s rights issues. During the São Paulo Forum in 2017, Global Child Forum presented a report which revealed that South American companies are underperforming overall in addressing children's rights.

The Global Child Forum also conducts case studies on companies who have scored highly on benchmarks.

The Children’s Rights and Business Atlas is a risk assessment tool intended to help businesses identify and understand the risk of children’s rights violations and give an indication of the risks to children’s rights in different industries and countries. The Atlas covers 198 countries and territories and 10 industries and was developed in collaboration with UNICEF.

References

External links 
 

Organizations established in 2009
Child-related organizations in Sweden